Barrier Dunes is a mountain in Barnstable County, Massachusetts.

References

Mountains of Massachusetts
Mountains of Barnstable County, Massachusetts